Utricularia capilliflora is an annual terrestrial carnivorous plant that belongs to the genus Utricularia (family Lentibulariaceae). It is endemic to the Northern Territory where it is a rather widespread species in the vicinity of Darwin.

See also 
 List of Utricularia species

References 

Carnivorous plants of Australia
Flora of the Northern Territory
capilliflora
Lamiales of Australia
Taxa named by Ferdinand von Mueller